Kiamariga is a settlement in Kenya's Embu County.

References 

Embu County